Tomellana hupferi is a species of sea snail, a marine gastropod mollusk in the family Clavatulidae.

Description
The glossy shell corresponds in shape and construction to Tomellana lineata var. gracilis. The difference shows up visibly at the fourth whorl. The folding of the upper whorls corresponds to that of Tomellana lineata until the 6th or 7th whorl, only to become obsolete upwards. Also the spiral sculpture is lacking in the upper whorls. It becomes visible under magnification on the lower whorls as more or less clearly visible incised striae. The oval aperture below shows extensive rough furrows. The top of the aperture has a white callus that is not as prominent as in Tomellana lineata.

The color of the shell is light brownish-yellow with broad darker stripes. In the middle of the body whorl is an articulated whitish strip recognizable.

Distribution
This marine species occurs off Cameroon.

References

 Bozzetti L., 2015. Due nuove Fusiturris (Gastropoda: Neogastropoda: Clavatulidae) dall' Africa Occidentale. Malacologia Mostra Mondiale 86: 8–10

External links

Endemic fauna of Cameroon
hupferi
Gastropods described in 1912